The 2014 EHF Women's Champions League Final Four was the final stage of the 2013–14 EHF Women's Champions League, the 53rd season of Europe's premier club handball tournament organized by European Handball Federation. The event was the first Final Four tournament in the competition's history, having been introduced in November 2013. It was played at the László Papp Budapest Sports Arena in Budapest, Hungary on 3–4 May 2014.

Host selection
The Executive Committee of the European Handball Federation (EHF) opened the bidding process for the organization of the event on 24 July 2013. The EHF received four bids until the deadline of 10 September 2013, including three from Hungary, all of them naming the László Papp Budapest Sports Arena as the possible host arena; and one from Slovenia, that proposed the Arena Stožice.

In the first round the bids of Nexus Communications and SportConcept were eliminated, leaving the application of RK Krim Ljubljana and the joint bid of Hungarofest and the Hungarian Handball Federation in competition. After close examinations of the remaining bids, on 21 November 2013, the EHF Finance Delegation on behalf of the EHF Executive Committee awarded the organization rights to Budapest.

Tournament

Bracket

Semifinals

Third-place playoff

Final

References

External links
Official website

Handball in Hungary
Hand
Hand
International sports competitions in Budapest
2012–13 Women's EHF Champions League